When Husbands Deceive is a 1922 American silent drama film directed by Wallace Worsley and starring Leah Baird, William Conklin and  Eulalie Jensen.

Cast
 Leah Baird as 	Viola Baxter
 William Conklin as Marshall Walsh
 Jack Mower as Richard Fletcher
 Eulalie Jensen as Lulu Singleton
 John Cossar as 	Andrew Singleton

References

Bibliography
 Munden, Kenneth White. The American Film Institute Catalog of Motion Pictures Produced in the United States, Part 1. University of California Press, 1997.

External links

1922 films
1922 drama films
American black-and-white films
Silent American drama films
American silent feature films
1920s English-language films
Films directed by Wallace Worsley
Associated Exhibitors films
1920s American films